Fabiano Eller dos Santos, known as Fabiano Eller (born 19 November 1977 in Linhares), is a Brazilian former footballer who last played as a central defender for Náutico.

In the 2006 season, he played for Internacional while on loan from Turkish giants Trabzonspor.
On 11 March 2007 Eller played his first game in La Liga, for Atlético Madrid against Deportivo La Coruña. He scored his first goal in La Liga, in an away match against Villarreal, on 8 April 2007.
In the 2009 season Eller returned to Internacional and won 2010 Copa Libertadores.
After Copa Libertadores, Eller signed with Qatari side Al-Ahly.
He has one international cap, gained in a friendly match when Brazil played against Guatemala on 27 April 2005.

Honours

Club
Vasco da Gama
Campeonato Brasileiro: 1997, 2000
Campeonato Carioca: 1998
Copa Libertadores: 1998
Torneio Rio - São Paulo: 1999
Copa Mercosul: 2000

Flamengo
Taça Guanabara: 2004
Campeonato Carioca: 2004

Fluminense
Taça Rio: 2005
Campeonato Carioca: 2005

Internacional
Copa Libertadores: 2006 and 2010
FIFA Club World Cup: 2006

Individual
 Campeonato Brasileiro Série A Team of the Year: 2006

References

1977 births
People from Linhares
Brazilian footballers
Brazil international footballers
Brazilian expatriate footballers
Campeonato Brasileiro Série A players
Süper Lig players
La Liga players
Atlético Madrid footballers
CR Vasco da Gama players
Sociedade Esportiva Palmeiras players
CR Flamengo footballers
Fluminense FC players
Sport Club Internacional players
Santos FC players
Trabzonspor footballers
Esporte Clube São José players
Red Bull Brasil players
Copa Libertadores-winning players
Brazilian expatriate sportspeople in Turkey
Expatriate footballers in Turkey
Al-Wakrah SC players
Brazilian people of German descent
Al Ahli SC (Doha) players
Association football defenders
Living people
Qatar Stars League players
Sportspeople from Espírito Santo